The 930s BC is a decade which lasted from 939 BC to 930 BC.

Events and trends
 935 BC—Death of Zhou gong wang, King of the Zhou Dynasty of China.
 935 BC—Death of Tiglath-Pileser II king of Assyria.
 934 BC—Ashur-dan II succeeds his father as King of Assyria.
 934 BC—Zhou yi wang becomes King of the Zhou Dynasty of China.
 931 BC—Solomon died in Jerusalem. The country split into two kingdoms: Israel (including the cities of Shechem and Samaria) in the north and Judah (containing Jerusalem) in the south.

Significant people
 Baasha, king of Israel, is born (approximate date).

References 

 

es:Años 930 a. C.